Route 412, also known as Seal Cove Road, is a  east–west highway on the Baie Verte Peninsula of Newfoundland in the Canadian province of Newfoundland and Labrador. It connects the town of Seal Cove, along the community of Wild Cove (via Route 419), with Baie Verte and Route 410 (Dorset Trail).

Route description

Route 412 begins along the coast of White Bay in downtown Seal Cove. It winds its way east to climb a hill to leave town and passing through rural wooded areas for several kilometres, where it has an intersection with Route 419 (Wild Cove Road). The highway passes through more wooded areas to enter Baie Verte and it comes to an end at an intersection with Route 410 at the southwestern edge of town.

Major intersections

References

412